The 1957 UCI Track Cycling World Championships were the World Championship for track cycling. They took place in Rocourt, Belgium from 10 to 15 August 1957. Five events for men were contested, 3 for professionals and 2 for amateurs.

Medal summary

Medal table

See also
 1957 UCI Road World Championships

References

Track cycling
UCI Track Cycling World Championships by year
International cycle races hosted by Belgium
Sport in Liège
1957 in track cycling